Beaky Buzzard is an animated cartoon character in the Warner Bros. Looney Tunes and Merrie Melodies series of cartoons.

He is a young turkey vulture (sometimes called a "buzzard" in the United States) with black body feathers and a white tuft around his throat. His neck is long and thin, bending 90 degrees at an enormous Adam's apple. His neck and head are featherless, and his beak and feet are large and yellow or orange, depending on the cartoon. The character is depicted as simpleminded with drawled speech, a perpetual silly grin, and partially-closed eyes.

Beaky was partly based on Edgar Bergen's puppet Mortimer Snerd.

Popularity
The films were popular in theaters, and the character was familiar enough to be included in the cameo in Carrotblanca

Short subjects
The character first appeared in the 1942 cartoon Bugs Bunny Gets the Boid, directed by Bob Clampett. The cartoon's plot revolves around the hopeless attempts of the brainless buzzard, here called Killer, to catch Bugs Bunny for his domineering Eastern European mother back at the nest. Beaky's voice was reminiscent of ventriloquist Edgar Bergen's character Mortimer Snerd (his in-studio name was in fact "Snerd Bird", bestowed by Bob Clampett himself; he was not named "Beaky" on-screen in this first appearance). The voice itself was provided by voice actor Kent Rogers.

Clampett brought the character back in the 1945 film The Bashful Buzzard, a cartoon that closely mirrors its predecessor, only this time featuring Beaky's hapless hunting (contrasting with the war-like formation flying and dive bombing of his brothers) without Bugs as an antagonist. Rogers reprised his role as the character's voice for the film, but he was killed in a Naval aviation training accident at Pensacola, Florida before finishing all his dialogue.

Clampett left the studio in 1946, ending Beaky's career for a time. The character was eventually brought back in the 1950 Friz Freleng film The Lion's Busy, now voiced by Mel Blanc. Freleng made the buzzard smarter, pitting him against a dim-witted lion named Leo. Robert McKimson also featured the character in a film that year, Strife with Father. McKimson's Beaky is again back to his idiotic self, this time under the tutelage of his adoptive father, a sparrow who is trying to teach Beaky how to survive in the wild.

Later minor appearances
Beaky has had minor roles in various Warner Bros. projects, such as Tiny Toon Adventures, where he plays the mentor of the character Concord Condor, and the movies Space Jam (1996) as a member of the Tune Squad, 2003's Looney Tunes: Back in Action as an Acme pilot voiced by Joe Alaskey, and Space Jam: A New Legacy (2021) very briefly seen leaving Tune World in Bugs' flashback, in front of an unknown figure and Cecil Turtle.

Beaky Buzzard appeared in The Sylvester & Tweety Mysteries in the episode "3 Days & 2 Nights of the Condor", where he was voiced by Jeff Bennett. Beaky's mother, who appeared in many of his original shorts, also appeared in an episode of the show (voiced by Tress MacNeille).

Beaky made a cameo in Bah, Humduck! A Looney Tunes Christmas as one of Daffy's employeers and appeared in The Looney Tunes Show episode from second season "Ridiculous Journey", voiced by Jim Cummings.

Beaky's most recent appearance was in the Looney Tunes Cartoons series, voiced by Michael Ruocco.

Beaky appears in the preschool series Bugs Bunny Builders, where he is a female bird and renamed Bizzy Buzzard.

Comics and merchandising
Beaky is featured in several issues of Dell Comics' Looney Tunes comic book series, usually paired with another minor player, Henery Hawk, and additionally appeared in a print spinoff of Space Jam in 1997. The character was licensed for Looney Tunes merchandise such as a metal coin bank, and, in 1973, a collectible Pepsi bottle.

Filmography

Warner Films theatrical short subjects
 Bugs Bunny Gets the Boid (1942)
 The Bashful Buzzard (1945)
 The Lion's Busy (1950)
 Strife with Father (1950)

Other appearances
Film
 Carrotblanca (1995) (cameo)
 Space Jam (1996)
 Looney Tunes: Back in Action (2003) voiced by Joe Alaskey.

Television
 Tiny Toon Adventures (in "High Toon") voiced by Rob Paulsen.
 The Sylvester & Tweety Mysteries (in "3 Days & 2 Nights of the Condor") voiced by Jeff Bennett.
 The Looney Tunes Show (in "Ridiculous Journey") voiced by Jim Cummings.
 Looney Tunes Cartoons (2020) voiced by Michael Ruocco.

Audio recordings
 Bugs Bunny in Storyland (1949) (as Simple Simon)

References

Looney Tunes characters
 
Fictional birds of prey
Anthropomorphic birds
Fictional anthropomorphic characters
Film characters introduced in 1942